The Inevitable is a 2016 nonfiction book by Kevin Kelly that forecasts the twelve technological forces that will shape the next thirty years.

Summary
According to Kelly, much of what will happen in the next thirty years is inevitable. The future will bring with it even more screens, tracking, and lack of privacy. In the book he outlines twelve trends that will forever change the ways in which we work, learn and communicate: The chapters are organized by these forces.

Becoming: Moving from fixed products to always upgrading services and subscriptions 
Cognifying: Making everything much smarter using cheap powerful AI that we get from the cloud 
Flowing: Depending on unstoppable streams in real time for everything
Screening: Turning all surfaces into screens 
Accessing: Shifting society from one where we own assets to one where instead we will have access to services at all times
Sharing: Collaboration at mass scale. Kelly writes, "On my imaginary Sharing Meter Index we are still at 2 out of 10."
Filtering: Harnessing intense personalization in order to anticipate our desires 
Remixing: Unbundling existing products into their most primitive parts and then recombining in all possible ways 
Interacting: Immersing ourselves inside our computers to maximize their engagement 
Tracking: Employing total surveillance for the benefit of citizens and consumers 
Questioning: Promoting good questions is far more valuable than good answers 
Beginning: Constructing a planetary system connecting all humans and machines into a global matrix

Critical response
Kirkus Reviews notes that "Kelly’s arguments ring true, and his enthusiasm [about the future] is contagious". Publishers Weekly also highlights that this book reflect Kelly's "optimistic and arguably idealistic view" and that he "chooses to elide discussions of the specific downsides that likely will accompany the changes he describes".

See also
 Out of Control
 What Technology Wants

References

2016 non-fiction books
American non-fiction books
Viking Press books
Technology books
Futurology books